The Philips PM5544 was the first in a series of television pattern generators, most commonly used to provide a television station with a complex test card commonly referred to as a Philips Pattern or PTV Circle pattern. The content and layout of the pattern was designed by Danish engineer Finn Hendil (da; 1939–2011) in the Philips TV & Test Equipment laboratory in Brøndby Municipality near Copenhagen under supervision of chief engineer Erik Helmer Nielsen in 1966–67, largely building on their previous work with the monochrome PM5540 pattern. The equipment, the PM5544 Test Pattern Generator, which generates the pattern, was made by engineer Finn Hendil and his group in 1968–69. The same team would also develop the Spanish TVE colour test card in 1973.

Since the widespread introduction of the PM5544 from the early-1970s, the Philips Pattern has become one of the most commonly used test cards, with only the SMPTE and EBU colour bars as well as the BBC's Test Card F coming close to its usage.

The Philips PM5544 pattern was later incorporated into other test pattern generators from Philips itself, as well as test pattern generators from various other manufacturers. Various configurations and modifications exist.  Other related test card generators and patterns by Philips are the PM5400 family (with support for widescreen and PALplus),  PM5515/16/18, PM5519, PM5520 (monochrome), PM5522 (PAL), PM5534, PM5538 (see section below), PM5540 (monochrome), PM5543, PM5547, PM5552, PM5631, PM5643, PM5644, PM5572/73/74 and PT5300 (Digital).

Operation

Rather than previous test card approaches that worked by a live camera or monoscope filming a printed card, the Philips PM5544 generates the test patterns fully using electronic circuits, with separate paths for Y, R-Y and B-Y colour components, allowing engineers to reliably test and adjust transmitters and receivers for signal disturbances and colour separation, for instance for PAL broadcasts.

In simple terms, the displayed pattern provides reference levels of black, white and colour saturation, to which a receiver can be set. Displayed image geometry (image centering, correct proportions of the circle, etc.) can also be corrected. More technical adjustments are also possible.

Main technical features of the test card:
Circle with b/w and colour information 
Square wave - Repeating black and white (75% amplitude) blocks resembling a (same amplitude as the colour bar);
Colour bar - Yellow, cyan, green, magenta, red and blue with 100% saturation and 75% amplitude (EBU colour bars);
Crossed lines - at the centre of the circle, they allow to check for proper interlace;
Definition lines -  sine wave gratings with TV line frequencies corresponding to 0.8, 1.8, 2.8, 3.8 and 4.8 MHz;
Stair case - greyscale with 6 levels (can display up to 10);
White black step with needle pulse;
Colour step - Red on yellow background colours, 75% amplitude;
To the left of the Circle: 
Vertical bar - line alternating positive and negative R-Y signal;
Vertical bars - positive and negative R-Y signal;
Two rectangles - G-Y signal;
To the right of the Circle: 
Vertical bar - line alternating positive and negative B-Y signal;
Vertical bars - positive and negative B-Y signal;
Two rectangles - G-Y signal;
Background:
Grid - made from 14 horizontal x 19 vertical lines;
Background Level - adjustable between 0 to 80% amplitude;
B/W border castellations;

Pattern variations

4:3 (original) 
While the basic specifications of the pattern normally remain consistent, there are often small variations depending on the brand and type of generator used to produce it, as well as how the broadcaster has chosen to configure it. Some television stations have included a digital clock and/or date, as well as the station logo or ID, inside the "circle. This practice was common in Asia and some parts of Europe, as well as in South Africa.

SECAM 
The Philips circle pattern is geared towards the PAL colour-coding system, but SECAM versions do exist (for example, it was used by TVP in Poland and TDF in France, without side bars, as well as ERT in Greece and VTV in Vietnam, with side bars). The most obvious difference is the absence of PAL specific test features (to two normally invisible outmost vertical bars). Less noticeable is the change to the multiburst gratings, due to the differing TV system.

NTSC 
Likewise, there are 525-lines NTSC versions of the pattern. One of the NTSC variants, used in Philippines, Taiwan, Haiti and Japan (by NHK, with the multiburst gratings slightly modified for NTSC-J), has a modified square wave near the top of the circle at 300 kHz and the multiburst gratings at 0.5, 1.0, 2.0, 3.0 and 4.0 MHz. (WNYW's configuration simply removed the side colour bars.) A second variation, used by CBC Montreal in Quebec, Canada, had different gratings and added extra colour bars.

PAL-M 
In addition to the 525-line NTSC pattern, a PAL-M version of the pattern exists. It is identical to the NTSC pattern but includes achromatic fields adjacent to the side bars.

16:9 (widescreen) 
The 16:9 version of the circle pattern retains the signals present in the original, and features additional signals to test signal and picture quality, including Television lines resolution, corner circles and correct overscan and image centering.

Several different types of hardware are known to generate it, including the PM5644 (widescreen versions only), PT5230 and PT5300 (with appropriate pattern generator modules installed) and the PM5420.

It was used by broadcasters such as RAI (Italy), BRT (Belgium), RTL-TVI (Belgium/Luxembourg), Ned3 (Netherlands), TVE (Spain) and KNR TV (Greenland)..

High definition
An HD (1080p) version of the Philips circle pattern was developed for the PT5300 via the PT8612 HD Signal Generator add-on. It was never formally integrated into the PT8612 thus was not offered for sale.

Squared version
A variation of the PM5544/34 pattern has been recorded where the circle generator is bypassed or faulty. This reveals the full contents of the central pattern elements, which are normally cropped. Anecdotally this pattern has been referred to as "PM5538" however the PM5538 was not a Philips pattern generator. It was used in some parts of the Middle East like Dubai 33 in the UAE and Jordan Radio and Television Corporation (JRTV) in Jordan.

GB2097 inspection chart 
Starting from the late-1990s, China Central Television and some provincial Mainland Chinese broadcasters began using a heavily modified version of the PM5544 called the GB2097 inspection chart. At around the same time, another modification, anecdotally called "PM5549" (the Philips PM5549 was an unrelated product) began to be used at the headends of some Mainland Chinese cable television providers.

Physical equipment

PM5544 

The design of the original PM5544 is fairly complicated, with an array of analogue signal generators generating each component of the pattern continuously. Digital circuitry is used to sequence the outputs from each module into the final pattern. The circle is internally generated as a square and cropped according to vectors defined in a ROM chip.

The PM5544 was not capable of generating a composite video signal by itself. At the time it was introduced three additional pieces of equipment were required: a PM5554 PAL colour encoder, a PM5555 PAL subcarrier generator and a PM5530 sync generator. Over the years the physical implementation of this supporting equipment was refined concluding with the PM5638 which was able to replace all three in a single 1RU unit.

The physical configuration of the PM5544 depends upon its purpose. A common application was in TV factories where it was typically used in its most basic configuration with no optional extras. When used for Broadcast it was usually fitted with the PM5543 text generator which allowed broadcasters to display text in the upper and lower black boxes.

PM5534 
In the late-1970s Philips introduced the PM5534 which replaced the original PM5544. It was fundamentally a very similar design using a mixture of analogue and digital circuitry to generate the pattern, however it no longer required an external sync generator and colour encoder (typically a PM5532 or PM5530 paired with either a PM5545 or PM5554/PM5555). reducing the rack footprint from 6RU/12RU to 3RU. The PM5534 was available in 6 different versions: PAL-G, PAL-I, PAL-M, PAL-N, SECAM and NTSC.

PM5644 
Some time during the late-1980s Philips introduced a new design of colour pattern generator bearing the model number PM5644. The PM5644 further improves upon the PM5534 by reducing the overall size to just 1RU.

It also differs from the PM5544/PM5534 in that its pattern generating circuitry is entirely digital, stored in EPROM chips allowing easy reprogramming and modification of patterns. This has an additional advantage that higher resolution text or graphics can appear in areas of the pattern designated for customisation by the Broadcaster whereas a standard PM5544 was typically restricted to 7 (top box) and 11 (bottom box) characters of text programmed by an array of physical links on a card inside the unit, limiting what the broadcaster could display in these areas without specially designed assemblies.

The PM5644 (and later generators) patterns' were defined by vectors in MS-DOS batch files, with individual components of the pattern rendered by an array of in-house tools.

Many variations of the PM5644 are known to exist, each with different purposes and capabilities:

4:3 models
The earliest design shares a chassis and some modules with the PM5631 colour generator and has 576 KB of pattern ROM. The pattern generating circuitry is designed in accordance to CCIR 601.

It is also effectively hard-wired for 4:3 patterns typical of the earlier PM55xx series as it assumes that the edges of the pattern are composed of repeating sequences. The pattern produced by these units is nearly identical to the PM5544, however the reflection check in the bottom box is omitted. It can be reinstated by the PM8546 logo generator if installed. These units are able to display a minor variation of the pattern with cuts-outs for a clock, or a clock with date. The generation of the clock and date must be performed by either a PM8546 or an external teletext generator supplied by the Broadcaster. Variations exist for every video standard. This model is able to replace every type of PM55xx pattern generator.

Another variation exists using 4.5 MB of pattern ROM, also adhering to CCIR 601 but featuring a luminance clock of 20 MHz. It can generate any arbitrary rasterised pattern with no restrictions and additionally can generate signals which exceed the bandwidth of all PAL variants.

FuBK models
Two variations bearing the model numbers PM5644G/50 (PAL B/G) and PM5644G/70 (YCbCr) were available programmed with the FuBK pattern.

16:9 models
The earliest known PM5644 16:9 hardware is the PM5644G/90 and PM5644G/924 which use the same chassis and PCB as the 4:3 models, however, both are programmed with the well-known 16:9 circle pattern alongside several other simple patterns. They generate an anamorphic signal thus both do not support PALplus.

The last known design has controls and a display on the front panel and is labelled PM5644 PALplus test pattern generator and bears the model number PM5644/85. No other variations of this hardware are presently known. This design also generates the well known 16:9 colour circle pattern but unlike the previously mentioned G/90 and G/924 models, it is capable of encoding a PALplus signal. It also is capable of generating the 4:3 pattern of the original PM5544.

PT5210/PT5230/PT5300

Around 1997 with the PM5644 nearing end of life; Philips began work on the final generation of hardware that would generate the circle pattern. The first in this series was the PT5210, which through the PT8601 analogue pattern generator module, was able to generate a single complex pattern however only by special order. At least one circle pattern configuration is known.

Around this time Philips exited the TV test equipment business, with the lab that developed these products subsequently renamed to ProTeleVision Technologies A/S. All products were immediately rebranded ProTeleVision. The PT5230 was the first to exclusively carry the new brand and included an enhanced analogue pattern generator option – the PT8631, which was able to generate all Philips (NTSC and PAL) and FuBK patterns in both 4:3 and 16:9 in a single configuration. Like its predecessor (the PM5644), customer specific patterns were offered.

In 2001, shortly after the release of the PT5230, said product line was further divested to DK-Audio A/S (Also based in Copenhagen, Denmark at the time). Other pattern generator products not included in the sale, but still under warranty or with active support plans such as the PM5644 and PM5534 were abandoned by ProTeleVision to be fulfilled by Arepa Test & Calibration. ProTeleVision became the current ProTelevision Technologies (lowercase 'V') shortly thereafter signifying a shift exclusively to digital transmission products. 

DK-Audio (also known as DK-Technologies) subsequently released the PT5300, which superseded the PT5230, accepting all of its pattern generator modules and included many new options and features developed by DK-Audio. It was the last physical pattern generator directly descending from the original PM5544 to generate the Philips circle pattern.

SECAM was not supported by any models from this series leaving the PM5644L as the last SECAM variant.

In 2018 the PT5300 was discontinued. In 2022 the PT5300 (and PT5210/PT5230) were open sourced by DK-Technologies.

Philips test cards in the digital era

Standard definition
While the Philips circle pattern is designed specifically for testing analogue transmission chains and televisions; it is known to have been used with digital transmissions. 

The aforementioned PT5210, PT5230 and PT5300 all optionally include SDI outputs in addition to analogue. While these products are mostly focused on patterns for digital transmission, an optional hardware upgrade was available for the PT5210, PT5230 and PT5300 (PT8603/903 for the PT5210 and PT8633 for the PT5230/PT5300) which provides the traditional 4:3 and 16:9 circle patterns of the PM5644 (in standard definition only). In the case of the PT8633, options available include a 5 or 10 step grayscale staircase for both formats and the option to omit the corner circles for the 16:9 pattern combined with digital specific features such a moving bar in the bottom box to test if the stream is live or frozen. Pulsed audio can also be generated for synchronisation testing. Known transmissions include 2RN in Ireland, TVB J2 in Hong Kong and ABC Television in Australia. Other digital pattern generators which generate patterns resembling that of the PM5644 are known such as those from Promax.

Pattern variation gallery

Worldwide usage

PAL broadcasts
Many broadcasters that adopted the 625-line PAL system used some form of the Philips PM5544 pattern.

Africa
In South Africa, the South African Broadcasting Corporation (SABC) made use of the PM5544 pattern since it started testing its first television system in 1975, but independent broadcasters M-Net, which launched in 1986, and e.tv, which launched in 1998, opted to use Telefunken FuBK instead.

In Zimbabwe, the PM5544 was used by Zimbabwe Broadcasting Corporation (ZBC) from the start of its regular colour broadcasts in the early-1980s, replacing the Indian-head test pattern.

In Niger, the PM5544 was used by Télé Sahel.

In Western Sahara, a modified version of the PM5544 was used by RASD TV.

The PM5544 was also used in Algeria and Kuwait.

Asia
The PM5544 test card was first introduced in Singapore by its national broadcaster Radio Television Singapore (RTS; now Mediacorp) (in conjunction with a modified version of Test Card F) upon the start of regular colour broadcasts in Singapore in 1974. While the PM5544 ceased to be seen on said country's two main television channels (Channel 5 and Channel 8) upon introducing 24/7 schedules in 1995, the PM5544 continued to be seen on its minority and thematic channels until approximately 2005–06.

The PM5544 was later introduced in Malaysia by its public broadcaster Radio Televisyen Malaysia (RTM) from its introduction of regular colour broadcasts in 1978–80 (replacing its previous monochrome Pye Test Card G) until it switched to a 24/7 schedule in 2012; and was also used by said country's first commercial station TV3 from the launch of its television service in 1984 until it adopted a 24/7 schedule in 2014.

The PM5544 was also used by the Indonesian national TV broadcaster TVRI, replacing its previous Telefunken FuBK test card, from the mid-1980s until it switched to a 24/7 schedule in 2021.

In the People's Republic of China, the PM5544 was used by its national broadcaster CCTV as well as some provincial/regional broadcasters such as Shenzhen Media Group and Television Southern in Guangdong Province, Xizang STV in Tibet Autonomous Region, Yuyao TV in  Zhejiang Province and Ningxia Television in Ningxia Hui Autonomous Region. CCTV also later used a heavily modified version of the PM5544 called the GB2097 inspection chart. Nowadays, many modern Mainland Chinese test card designs, like in Hong Kong, incorporate elements of the PM5544, PM5644 and Snell & Wilcox test card designs. In Hong Kong, the PM5544 was used by RTV/ATV and TVB from the 1970s (replacing the RMA 1946 Resolution Chart and EIA 1956 resolution chart) until approximately 2007–2009. TVB then switched to its own test card designs incorporating elements of the PM5544, PM5644 and Snell & Wilcox SW2 designs, although its sister channel TVB J2 has also used the widescreen PM5644. 

In Israel, the PM5544 was used by Israel Broadcasting Authority (IBA) and Israeli Educational Television (IETV) from their launch of colour broadcasts in the early-1980s, replacing its previous monochrome Philips PM5540 test card after a nearly decade-long delay in introducing colour television to said country for various sociopolitical reasons.

In Qatar, the PM5544 was used by Qatar TV.

Saudi Broadcasting Authority (SBA) in Saudi Arabia used a heavily modified version of the Philips PM5544 pattern from 1982 until 2009, with the side "brackets" removed and 1/4 of the top half of the PM5544 "circle" replaced with a white and black background and colour bars.

Oceania
The PM5544 was also in widespread use in Australia for many years, most notably with the Australian Broadcasting Corporation (ABC) from its launch of colour broadcasts in 1974–75 and Special Broadcasting Service (SBS) from its launch of television services in 1980. Some commercial stations also used it.

In New Zealand, it was used by TVNZ from its launch of colour broadcasting in 1973.

Europe
In Denmark, where the PM5544 was invented, it was used by its national broadcaster Danmarks Radio (DR) from its launch of regular colour broadcasts in 1970, immediately replacing Test Card F and Philips PM5552, and later on the monochrome Pye Test Card G and Philips PM5540; as well as its first nationwide commercial channel TV 2 during its pre-launch tests and its downtime hours and subsequently also on most of the latter's regional and themed channels. DR, TV 2 and TV 2 Film also later used the widescreen PM5644 for widescreen broadcasts from the 1990s. In Greenland, the PM5544 and widescreen PM5644 are used by its public broadcaster Kalaallit Nunaata Radioa (KNR) since its launch of television services in 1982. A modified variant of the PM5644 is used by the Faroese public broadcaster Kringvarp Føroya (KvF) alongside the EBU colour bars during off-air hours.

The BBC in the United Kingdom occasionally used a slightly modified version called Test Card G from 1971 until the late-1990s, in conjunction with Test Card F. The Independent Broadcasting Authority (IBA) initially used this card in the 1970s, also in conjunction with Test Card F and EBU colour bars, but eventually abandoned Test Card G and developed a unique test card called the ETP-1, which was brought into use on ITV from 1979 onwards. However, London Weekend Television (LWT) and ITV Channel Television, two constituent franchisee companies in the ITV network structure, continued to use Test Card G well into the 1980s and 1990s. Test Card G was also used on BFBS/SSVC Television's low-powered terrestrial broadcasts serving British Armed Forces personnel in West Germany and West Berlin in the 1980s and 1990s. A modified version of Test Card G was also briefly used on Sky One alongside the Simplified Telefunken FuBK pattern in the early-1990s.

The PM5544 was also used by Raidió Teilifís Éireann (RTÉ) in the Republic of Ireland (in conjunction with the EBU colour bars shown after the Irish national anthem was played at closedown) from the start of its regular colour broadcasts in 1972 until they were replaced by RTÉ Aertel overnight in-vision teletext in mid-1996.

In the DACH countries, the PM5544 test card was used by the German commercial terrestrial channel RTL and the German public-service channel Phoenix. The Austrian public broadcaster ORF used a slightly modified version of the PM5544. Use of the PM5544 in the DACH was solely confined to these broadcasters, as most TV stations in these areas instead preferred to use the Telefunken FuBK test card when they adopted colour television.

In Italy, its national broadcaster RAI introduced the PM5544 test card in 1977 at the same time as it launched its first regular colour broadcasts, replacing heavily modified versions of the Indian-head test pattern. Later on, RAI then used the PM5644 widescreen variation for PALplus broadcasts. Telefriuli also used a heavily modified version of the PM5544 in the 1980s.

In Spain, the PM5544 was introduced by the various autonomous and private channels in the early-1980s notably by TV3, El 33, Telemadrid, Antena 3, EITB and Canal+ Spain, as well as on point-to-point terrestrial and satellite links operated by Retevisión and Telefónica Sistemas de Satélites. Spain's national public broadcaster TVE however instead primarily used its own TVE colour test card from 1975 until the mid-2000s, although in the 1990s it did also briefly used the widescreen PM5644 pattern.

In Iceland, the PM5544 was used by its national broadcaster RÚV from its launch of colour broadcasts in 1973–76, only fully replacing its heavily modified monochrome Philips PM5540 test card after 1982. RÚV subsequently replaced its PM5544 with a widescreen PM5644 in 2009, then discontinued all their on-air test card broadcasts in 2011. However, the privately owned subscription channels Stöð 2, launched in 1986, and Sjónvarp Símans, launched in 1999, opted not to use the PM5544.

In the former SFR Yugoslavia, the PM5544 was used by its national broadcaster Yugoslav Radio Television (JRT) in conjunction with the Telefunken FuBK test card. Use of the PM5544 continued for some time afterwards in some of its constituent successor countries.

In Bulgaria, the privately owned nationwide broadcaster bTV introduced the PM5544 in November 2000 with the start of its new program schedules, replacing the EBU colour bars, used from its launch on 1 June 2000. Use of the PM5544 was in its test card broadcasts until 17 February 2001 between 12:00 AM and 06:00 AM (the next day, bTV started 24-hour transmissions), and 2 times a year during transmitter maintenance until 2013.

The PM5544 was also used in Hungary, Belgium, Netherlands, Norway, and Sweden.

South America
In Argentina, the PM5544 was used by América TV, El Nueve and El Trece.

SECAM broadcasts
SECAM users of the Philips PM5544 test card included TDF (TF1, Antenne 2, FR3, Canal+, La Cinquième and M6) in France, Iraqi TV in Iraq, VTV in Vietnam and SNRT in Morocco. ERT in Greece and TVP in Poland started using the PM5544 for SECAM transmissions since the 1970s and continued using it after switching to PAL in the 1990s.

NTSC broadcasts
NTSC users of the Philips PM5544 test card included CBFT and CBMT in Quebec, Canada, WBOY-TV and WNYW in the United States, DZBB-TV in the Philippines, Myawaddy TV in Myanmar, KBS and MBC in South Korea, TTV, CTV, CTS and FTV in Taiwan and RTNH in Haiti. The Japanese national broadcaster, NHK, also used a 525-line version of the test card, albeit with slight technical differences as compared to those used by the American and Canadian broadcasters so as to conform with the NTSC-J system.

Usage gallery

See also 

 TVE test card
 Philips PM5540
 Telefunken FuBK
 ETP-1

References

External links 
 Philips TV Measuring Equipment, 1980 
 Technical information on the PM5544 test card
 Jerome Glick : Test Cards & Signals

Test cards
Broadcast engineering
Philips